Arrouiah was an Arabic language newspaper based in Kuwait City, Kuwait. The daily was briefly published between 2008 and 2010.

History
Arrouiah was established in February 2008, being the 12th daily in the country. It was a political daily, focusing on Kuwaiti events. Saud Al Sebeiei served as the editor-in-chief of the daily. The chairman of the board was Shireeda Abdullah Al Mousherji, and its general manager  was Mubarak Mazyad Al Mousherji.

Its publication was ceased on 29 July 2010 due to financial difficulties.

See also
List of newspapers in Kuwait

References

2008 establishments in Kuwait
Newspapers established in 2008
Arabic-language newspapers
Defunct newspapers published in Kuwait
2010 disestablishments in Kuwait
Publications disestablished in 2010
Mass media in Kuwait City